David's Bridal is a clothier in the United States that specializes in wedding dresses, prom gowns, and other formal wear. It is the largest American bridal-store chain.

David's Bridal currently operates 298 stores in 49 states, Canada, and the United Kingdom. It was acquired by May Department Stores in 2000, which was, in turn, bought by Federated Department Stores (the parent company of department store giant Macy's) in 2005. On November 17, 2006, David's Bridal was purchased by Leonard Green & Partners, on the same day that Federated also divested itself of After Hours Formalwear. On October 11, 2012, Clayton, Dubilier & Rice announced the completion of its acquisition of David's Bridal, Inc. In January 2019, David's Bridal emerged from bankruptcy. The retailer is now owned by a group of lenders including Oaktree Capital Group.

History
Beginning in 1945, David Reisberg decided that, instead of making wedding gowns for his pleasure, he would sell them to others for a profit. In 1950, David's Bridal first started as a small bridal boutique in Fort Lauderdale, Florida. In 1972, Floridian Phillip Youtie purchased the salon with intentions to open new locations. Between that time and 1988, Youtie successfully grew his investment from a single store to 18 boutiques. Many of these boutiques were leased bridal stores that were in department stores under David's Bridal name. Steven Erlbaum, a late childhood friend of Youtie, eventually joined forces with Youtie to help bring David's Bridal to all 50 states. Erlbaum, having preexisting experience from creating the Philadelphia-based store chain Mr. Good Buys (now defunct), was able to give knowledge to Youtie. Erlbaum and Youtie eventually incorporated the company, structuring it for the national market. A warehouse was built in Hallandale Beach, Florida—near Fort Lauderdale. The corporate headquarters are in Conshohocken, Pennsylvania.

Stores at this time stocked only sample gowns in a standard size. Youtie and Erlbaum changed the store model in the late 1980s with this warehouse off Interstate 95 where they stocked designer gowns, discontinued dress and manufacturer overruns at below retail prices. This chain of bridal stores was like none of its kind. David's Bridal was all about making a no-frills shopping environment for those who need an expensive wedding dress for a fraction of the price. Stores were not comfortable, but more plain and warehouse-like. Although there was little to no comfort in the stores, brides-to-be could expect a bargain. Years later, as the business grew even larger and larger, small stores were starting to go out of business while more David's Bridal stores were being put into the business. Between 1994 and 1995, 12 stores were added to the bridal corporation. In 1999, DABR went public with over $104 million in assets and selling 8 million shares. In 2000, the May Department Stores Company bought David's Bridal from Youtie and Erlbaum for $436  million. By this time, David's Bridal was the largest retailer of bridal gowns and wedding-related merchandise. On November 17, 2006, David's Bridal was purchased by Leonard Green & Partners. David's Bridal is now the only nationwide competitor of bridal stores. One in four American brides are dressed by David's Bridal.

David's Bridal agreed to be acquired by the private-equity firm Clayton, Dubilier & Rice in 2012 for a price around $900 million.

On October 11, 2012, Clayton, Dubilier & Rice announced the completion of its acquisition of David's Bridal, Inc. in a deal that valued the company at $1.05 billion.

In August 2016, David's announced  the former president and CEO of the Gap Inc., Paul Pressler as chief executive officer.

In May 2018, Scott Key was named chief executive officer.

On November 19, 2018, David's filed for Chapter 11 bankruptcy.

In January 2019, David's Bridal emerged from bankruptcy. The retailer is now owned by a group of lenders including Oaktree Capital Group.

Tom Lynch, former chief executive at Frederick's of Hollywood, succeeded Scott Key as the interim chief executive officer in March 2019. David's Bridal also announced the former interim chief revenue officer and CFO at National Stores, Inc., Curt Kroll, would take the role of Chief Financial Officer.

On June 24, 2019, David's appointed James A. Marcum as the chief executive officer, replacing Tom Lynch who had been the interim CEO.

References

External links
 
Careers

Clothing retailers of the United States
American companies established in 1950
Clothing companies established in 1950
Retail companies established in 1950
Private equity portfolio companies
Privately held companies based in Pennsylvania
1950 establishments in Florida
Companies based in Conshohocken, Pennsylvania
Companies that filed for Chapter 11 bankruptcy in 2018
May Department Stores
2000 mergers and acquisitions
2006 mergers and acquisitions
2012 mergers and acquisitions
2019 mergers and acquisitions
Wedding dresses